Verbotene Liebe ("Forbidden Love") is a German television soap opera created by Reg Watson for Das Erste. The show was set primarily in the German city of Düsseldorf although, at times, the city of Cologne and the Spanish island of Mallorca figured prominently in the show's story lines. First broadcast on 2 January 1995, Verbotene Liebe was originally broadcast in 24-minute episodes, five times a week. It expanded to 45-minute episodes on 21 June 2011 and trimmed back to 40-minute episodes on 23 January 2012 to accommodate an adjusted time-slot. In 2006, Pay-TV network Passion began broadcasting episodes of the show from the beginning.

Verbotene Liebe was initially based on original story and character outlines from the Australian soap opera Sons and Daughters, the show was also slightly influenced by the American soap opera Ryan's Hope, before evolving into a show of its own as the series progressed. The show originally focused on two core families: the wealthy Anstetten family and the middle-class Brandner family. More specifically, it dealt with the story of Jan Brandner and Julia von Anstetten, two strangers whose fascination for each other leads them to fall in love, neither of them cognizant that they are twins separated by their parents. It is this story of forbidden love that gave the series its title. As cast members left the show, many characters were written out of the storyline, and new ones were added. Sometimes this included whole families. Writers attempted to phase out the dwindling Brandner family by introducing a new middle-class family, the Prozeskis, as foils for the wealthy Anstettens, but the Brandners proved to be too popular with fans, and the Prozeskis left as quickly as they came. Later, much of the drama centered on the Wolf family and the aristocratic Lahnstein family.

The series became well known for its groundbreaking positive representation of LGBT characters and relationships. For this reason, it became popular with gay and lesbian audiences in Europe and the United States. The series tackled controversial issues such as drug addiction, murder, rape, suicide, adultery, homophobia, incest, alcoholism, schizophrenia, HIV, miscarriage, kidnapping, and sexual confusion.

In 2005, Verbotene Liebe received the Rose d'Or award for "Best Soap", and in 2010 was nominated for the category of "Best Soap or Telenovela". The show was nominated for eight German Soap Awards in 2011, winning three. In January 2011, the series began filming in high definition. The show ended on 26 June 2015, after 4664 episodes due to a decline of viewers. The February transition to weekly broadcasting did not bring the number of viewers they had expected.

Setting

The central focus of Verbotene Liebe was the fictional high society in and around Düsseldorf and Cologne. Set in a world of power and intrigue, main locations in the beginning were Friedenau Castle, the Brandner home and the bar No Limits (originally called Off Limits). While the location of Friednau Castle was abandoned in 2001 and followed by the short-lived location of Schönberg Manor and eventually Königsbrunn Castle, the Brandner home stayed with the show as a permanent location beyond the show's 15th anniversary. Friedenau Castle, Schönberg Manor and Königsbrunn Castle were supposed to show a lifestyle of rich aristocrats and the Brandner home was used as a contrast, showing life of a middle-class family. Ehreshoven Castle was used for on location shoots for the fictional Königsbrunn Castle.

The bar No Limits was the only original location left as of 2014. However, the set and location of the bar changed multiple times, most of the time explained within story. In 2014, the bar was relocated to its original location in the show. Other common settings were various penthouses, flat shares and offices over the years; from 2011 the show was mainly set in fashion with the fictional fashion brand LCL and from 2010, the Media Harbor Düsseldorf was used for most on-location shoots.

The show was produced in the Magic Media Company studios in Cologne's borough Ossendorf since 2003. The same studios were also the home of Alles was zählt. Verbotene Liebe was previously produced in the studios of WDR. The biggest build stage was the LCL set over three floors. For six months in 2011, the show was partly produced in Majorca, Spain for a separate story that eventually concluded in Düsseldorf.

History

Origins
Based on the Australian soap opera Sons and Daughters, Verbotene Liebe premiered in January 1995 on the German television channel Das Erste ("The First"). The remake was initially planned for RTL Television, another German channel, but executives there were skeptical that the concept of a love story between a brother and a sister could prove successful. Verbotene Liebe began with the story of Jan Brandner (Andreas Brucker) and Julia von Anstetten (Valerie Niehaus), a working class guy and a rich girl who meet randomly at an airport and are instantly attracted to each other. They fall in love, only to learn that they are actually twins separated at birth. The story of the two siblings is told in the first 600 episodes, and is identified today as the basis for the series title. In addition to Jan and Julia and their love story, the complex scheming of the other characters made the show popular with audiences. Clarissa von Anstetten (Isa Jank) becomes popular as Jan and Julia's conniving mother, and Tanja von Anstetten (Miriam Lahnstein) also rises to fame for being a murderous vixen. This classic formula brought Verbotene Liebe attention in the press and, with it, a large fan base resulting in three million viewers tuning in on a daily basis.

A new brother-sister love story between Henning von Anstetten (Patrik Fichte) and Marie von Beyenbach (Solveig Duda) began in 2001, though it is clear to audiences from the beginning that it is a scheme by Tanja, and Henning and Marie are not related. In 2006, Sarah Hofmann (Sina-Valeska Jung) and Leonard von Lahnstein (Lars Korten) are in love, but learn they have the same father, Johannes von Lahnstein (Thomas Gumpert). During Leonard's wedding to Jana Brandner (Vanessa Jung), Adrian Degenhardt (Klaus Zmorek) reveals that he, and not Johannes, is Leonard's father. A further twist on the sibling love story was introduced in 2009 with mentally ill Tristan von Lahnstein (Jens Hartwig), who is in love with his twin sister Helena (Renée Weibel) and plots to have her all to himself.

The series underwent some major changes when actress Niehaus announced her decision to leave the show after more than two years in the role of Julia. The writers re-focused the storyline on Clarissa and tried to put more attention on her with the addition of her family, the Prozeskis. This new middle-class family was to be the new counterpart to the wealthy Anstetten family, since many of the original Brandner family members had left the show. But the Brandners were too popular, and fans did not seem interested in Clarissa's origins or how she went about becoming a countess. As a result, Clarissa's mother, Erna, and her brother, Walter, were written out of the show by having the characters die in a car accident. Meanwhile, with his character's big, juicy storyline behind him, Andreas Brucker sought to leave his role as Jan. With Jan caught in a failed love relationship with Kerstin Richter, the writers chose to write both characters out of the show's storyline rather than recast the roles. The departures of both Niehaus and Brucker within such a brief amount of time led to the fan-created legend that Jan and Julia had reunited off-screen, somewhere else.

Even with her family gone, the focus remains on Clarissa as she is sent to war against Christoph and Barbara von Anstetten. Eventually, the writers again tried to dredge up Clarissa's past for a storyline. Peter Kaufmann, Clarissa's first husband, appears on the scene to expose Clarissa as a fraud and a bigamist, since the couple had never divorced. Years before, she had forced Peter to flee the country, and then had him declared dead, all before she ever met Christoph von Anstetten and Arno Brandner. However, at the beginning of the series it is revealed that Clarissa was just eighteen years old when she became pregnant by Arno. So a marriage before she even met Arno was either a huge continuity gaffe or that she had been married while in her early teens. The story was not well liked by fans nor by Jank herself. Disagreements with the producers over her role led to the actress's departure from the show a little over a year after the Peter Kaufmann story concluded. It took almost ten years to woo Jank back into the iconic role. Meanwhile, Clarissa's hate for Tanja von Anstetten develops into a heartless, cutthroat rivalry between the two women. From the beginning, Clarissa knows that Tanja is a dangerous person to have around. Having made a similar climb up the social ladder herself, Clarissa understands what Tanja is all about. So when Tanja pretends to be pregnant with the child of Henning von Anstetten, Clarissa's stepson, in order to get him to marry her, Clarissa exposes Tanja as a fraud and a golddigger. Tanja vows revenge on the entire Anstetten family and total destruction of Clarissa. After scoring a job at one of the Anstetten businesses, Tanja puts Clarissa's company in danger by trying to sell cheap knockoff clothing under the Ligne Clarisse label. The lines are drawn for battle, and the war continues today.

The end of the 90s saw the return of Henning von Anstetten, a number of love stories involving the younger characters, the gay love story of Ulli Prozeski and Tom Seifert, the exit of Barbara von Anstetten, and the introduction of Elisabeth Ryan, who would become an important part of the show in the next decade.

Gay/lesbian storylines
Though homosexual relationships were not new in German soap operas, Verbotene Liebe featured many notable same-sex romances during its run. Julia's original fiancé, Gero von Sterneck (Broder Hinrichsen), turns out to be gay and has relationships with both men and women before Hinrichsen left the show in 1998. Introduced in 1997, young Ulrich "Ulli" Prozeski (Andreas Stenschke) is eventually featured in a coming-out story when he becomes romantically involved with medical student Tom Seifert (Kay Böger) in 1999. After Stenschke left the show in late 2000, Tom begins dating Oliver Sabel (Jo Weil). Six months later, in 2001, Ulli suddenly returns to town for a short stay that creates tensions between Tom and Oliver. Tom and Ulli are finally reunited with guest appearances in the show's 10th anniversary episode in 2005.

In 2006, Verbotene Liebe celebrated the first lesbian wedding in German television history between Carla von Lahnstein (Claudia Hiersche) and Susanne Brandner (Claudia Scarpatetti). The show later paired Carla with Stella Mann (Anne Wis), a relationship embraced by fans because the characters "were portrayed like the other couples on the show, including scenes showing their physical intimacy."

Verbotene Liebe received international attention in 2008 with the love story of Christian Mann (Jo Weil) and Oliver Sabel (Thore Schölermann). Weil and Schölermann were lauded internationally for their cliché-free portrayal of a same-sex couple, and Olli and Christian's 2010 marriage was the first church wedding between two men ever dramatized on German television. In 2013, Verbotene Liebe was called "a beacon of LGBT inclusivity on an international level" amid the popularity of Olli and Christian.

The final same-sex love story Verbotene Liebe created was the relationship between former music star Marlene Wolf (Melanie Kogler) and fashion designer Rebecca von Lahnstein (Tatjana Kästel). The story of this couple began in 2012 and garnered a sizable international following. In November 2013, AfterEllen ranked the Marlene and Rebecca as No. 14 and 15 in their "Top 25 Lesbian/Bi Characters on TV" list, as two of only three non-English speaking characters. AfterEllen wrote at the time: "Sometimes you kiss your boyfriend's sister during a game of spin the bottle and the next thing you know, you’re falling in love with her and leaving your groom on your wedding day and chasing down your lesbian love before she flies off to Los Angeles forever. Soaps are soaps, all over the world, and their love stories are so ridiculously delicious. Even more amazing: A whole year after they confessed their feelings for each other, Rebecca and Marlene are both still alive! Four for you, Germany. You go, Germany."

Arno's death
In 2012, the character of Arno was diagnosed with Alzheimer's disease. The storyline got a lot of media attention due to the fact that no other German serial has dealt with the issue. GrundyUFA, the production company of Verbotene Liebe, promoted the story and promised an honest writing. Only weeks after GrundyUFA came out to support and brought awareness to Alzheimer's disease, Konrad Krauss' exit was first announced by Deutsche-Dailys and later confirmed by the show itself. Reminiscing about his seventeen years as the patriarch of the Brander family, Arno fulfilled his lifelong dream to become an architect and getting to know his grandchildren in his last year on the show. Krauss' departure was also covered by the tabloid magazine Bild, saying that the role of Arno Brandner was the heart and soul of the show. Verbotene Liebe without Arno would be unthinkable for fans but would now become a reality. Konrad Krauss told the paper that he isn't thinking of retirement:

Further Krauss explained what changed over the years he has been on the show and speaks about his experience in the beginning:

Konrad Krauss made his last appearance on 11 September 2012.

Cancellation
Rumors about a cancellation of the soap opera were first made back in the fall of 2010 after Verbotene Liebe and fellow soap opera Marienhof performed not well and Verbotene Liebe lost viewers a third year in a row. However, in February 2011, a decision was made about Das Erste's access primetime. Marienhof was canceled and Verbotene Liebe extended from 20 to 45 minutes. The ARD hoped that Verbotene Liebe could gain viewers again, brought back fan favorite - and original cast member - Isa Jank (Clarissa von Anstetten) and reintroduced the original story about siblings Jan and Julia; although the roles were recast. However the return of Jank's character was reviewed by most fans as underwhelming and the recasting of Jan and Julia got mixed reviews as well. Verbotene Liebe continued to lose in ratings and by 2014, the soap opera performed well under the market share of Das Erste.

On 17 July 2014 the Bild newspaper was first to report that the show has been canceled. Online magazine DWDL later confirmed the report, saying they were able to name several more sources about the cancellation. The reports suggest that Verbotene Liebe is finishing its last year and airing into January 2015; long enough to let the show live through its 20th anniversary.

An official statement by Das Erste was made on 18 July 2014; confirming the cancellation. Director of Program Volker Herres said: "20 years ago, the siblings Jan and Julia made Verbotene Liebe a German series hit. Who could have guessed back then that VL, as the glamor soap was soon only be called, would have such a long breath? But eventually all shades of the forbidden and glamorous are told. It is then necessary to stop at the right time. And in our opinion this is now. As painful as it may be for the loyal fans of the series. But one thing is sure: Verbotene Liebe wrote television history." ARD coordinator of access primetime Frank Beckmann added: "With great dedication and impressive creativity, the team of Verbotene Liebe has shaped the access primetime for years. We know the strength of the brand and the importance of their loyal fans. Therefore, we consider whether we can offer Verbotene Liebe in another form at a later date." The statement also confirmed that the soap opera will be replaced by the game show Quizduell, which was tested for four weeks in May 2014, and that Verbotene Liebe will air its series finale most likely in the beginning of 2015.

Rainer Wemken, CEO of UFA Serial Drama, shared the following statement hours after the ARD confirmed the cancellation: "The ARD has terminated the contract for Verbotene Liebe at this time. I regret this decision very much, especially because it is a series with a strong brand, with a large fan base that is also very popular on the Internet and achieves high polling numbers. We are therefore make offers to the ARD, how the series can continue  - possibly with other production or broadcast models - at a later date. I therefore hope very much that we can continue Verbotene Liebe."

Only hours after rumors of the cancellation started, Verbotene Liebe fans opened a Facebook page and a petition to fight for the survival of the soap opera.

The remaining original cast member Gabriele Metzger (Charlie Schneider) and the show's matriarch Martina Servatius (Elisabeth von Lahnstein) opened up about the cancellation in a statement to the Bild newspaper. Metzger received a mail about the cancellation. About her reaction the actress said: "I went into the garden, watered my lawn and cried." About the reason for the cancellation and the declining ratings, Metzger suggested that "look-wise, we have developed forward. But what makes a soap opera - exciting stories and characters with whom one can identify - moved into the background over the years." Meanwhile, Martina Servatius is criticizing Herres' statement about the cancellation that all stories are told: "That is nonsense. It was the desire of the ARD to extend the individual episodes from 20 to 45 minutes. We, the actors, have already feared then that this decision could break our necks. It's sad that the ARD twisted cause and effect in retrospect."

Sudden renewal and final cancellation
After over a month since the show was officially canceled, the Bild newspaper reports on 3 September 2014 that ARD might move ahead with a concept from the production company UFA to bring Verbotene Liebe back as a weekly series. The cast would undergo some changes to adjust to the new format and the production style of the show would change dramatically. The media-devoted websites Quotenmeter and DWDL.de agreed on the Bild report and suggested that official news about the future of Verbotene Liebe would be made in the upcoming days.

On 4 September 2014, official word broke that Verbotene Liebe would return as a weekly series in 2015 as soon as airing on the daily format has stopped. The network ordered 15 episodes and will air the weekly series Fridays at 6:50 PM. The show would introduce a new central character, Mila von Draskow, and still feature members of the Lahnstein family - namely Elisabeth, Ansgar, Sebastian, Tanja, Tristan and Rebecca, original character Charlie Schneider, the Helmke brothers and the younger set around Charlie's nephew Olli who were sharing a flat. Sets like the bistro Schneiders and the bar No Limits would also still be a part of the show. "There will be a new Verbotene Liebe with more shooting time, more opulent images and a dense plot. And yet the new look will still deliver intrigue, passion and great feelings - like many fans of Verbotene Liebe wished", said ARD coordinator of access primetime Frank Beckmann about the renewal.

The fifteen weekly episodes started on 27 February 2015 and lasted till 26 June 2015. The weekly season, which was called "Vergeltung" (Retribution) introduced new characters and a darker plot. Fans of the show widely criticized the new concept of the show and ratings ultimately turned even worse, leading to Das Erste canceling the show for good.

Cast and characters 

Verbotene Liebe initially centers on the working class Brandner family and the wealthy and aristocratic Von Anstettens, in particular the star-crossed romance between Jan Brandner (Andreas Brucker) and Julia von Anstetten (Valerie Niehaus). Jan and Julia turn out to be twins, the illegitimate offspring of Arno Brandner (Konrad Klauss) and Clarissa von Anstetten (Isa Jank). Conniving Clarissa soon finds a lifelong enemy in the murderous Tanja Wittkamp (Miriam Lahnstein), who first tries to marry into the Von Anstetten family, and then to destroy them. The series introduces the powerful Von Lansteins in 2003, led by patriarch Johannes von Lahnstein (Thomas Gumpert) and including his children Ansgar (Wolfram Grandezka), Leonard (Lars Korten), Carla (Claudia Hiersche) and Constantin (Milan Marcus).

Original cast member Konrad Krauss (Arno Brandner) left the show in 2012 after 18 years, and Gabriele Metzger (Charlie Schneider) was the only remaining original cast member when the series ended in 2015. Others like Miriam Lahnstein (Tanja von Lahnstein), Jo Weil (Oliver Sabel), Dominic Saleh-Zaki (Andi Fritsche) and Wolfram Grandezka (Ansgar von Lahnstein) were considered long-serving cast members.

Broadcasting and ratings

Broadcasting

Television
VL German Broadcast History:
 2 January 1995 − 30 December 2004: Mon−Fri 5:55 pm on Das Erste, approx. 23 minutes
 5 January 1998 − 25 September 1998: Mon−Fri 9:03 am on Das Erste (episodes 1−171)
 22 June 1999 − 30 December 1999: Mon−Fri 9.03 am on Das Erste (episodes 172−250)
 3 January 2005 − 28 December 2007: Mon−Fri 5:50 pm on Das Erste, approx. 23 minutes
 1 December 2006 – present on Passion (reruns; stylized as 'classics')
 7 January 2008 − 20 June 2011: Mon−Fri 6:00 pm on Das Erste, approx. 23 minutes
 21 June 2011 − 18 January 2012: Mon−Fri 6:00 pm on Das Erste, approx. 44 minutes
 23 January 2012 – 7 June 2012: Mon-Fri 5:50 pm on Das Erste, approx. 38 minutes
 22 June 2011 – 11 June 2012: Mon−Fri about 8:00 am on MDR (previous day's broadcast)
 6 September 2011 – 11 June 2012: Mon−Fri 12:00 pm on EinsFestival (previous day's broadcast)
 23 March 2012 − 11 June 2012: Mon−Fri 6:40 am on NDR (previous day's broadcast)
 16 April 2012 − 11 June 2012: Mon−Fri 11:45 am on BR (previous day's broadcast)
 11 June 2012 – 6 February 2015: Mon−Fri 6:00 pm on Das Erste, approx. 38 to 43 minutes
 12 June 2012 – 15 March 2013: Mon−Fri 6:40 am on NDR (previous day's broadcast)
 12 June 2012 – 21 March 2013: Mon−Fri 7:05 am on MDR (previous day's broadcast)
 12 June 2012 – 12 October 2012: Mon−Fri 11:45 am on BR (previous day's broadcast)
 12 June 2012 – 21 March 2013: Mon−Fri 12:00 pm on EinsFestival (previous day's broadcast)
 27 February 2015 - 26 June 2015: Fridays 6:50 pm on Das Erste, approx. 42 minutes

In the beginning, Verbotene Liebe aired weekdays at around 5:55 pm on Das Erste and was followed by fellow soap opera Marienhof, creating a soap line-up for the network. The line-up proved successful in its early years and showed a lot of contrast. VL was labeled as glamor soap, while Marienhof showed the working-class of fictional district in Cologne. Becoming a huge success, Das Erste decided to show reruns in the early morning. With a break from about nine months, the network aired the first 250 episodes, who later were labeled as the show's first season.

After seven years on the air, the soap opera started slowly to lose viewers. Still a ratings success several cast changes seemed to hurt the show in the process. When Das Erste decided to change the airtime of both soaps, Verbotene Liebe (5:50 pm) and Marienhof (6:20 pm), particularly VL had now to challenge RTL's soap opera Unter uns, which ended at 6:00 pm. After two years, Das Erste changed the airtime again. Verbotene Liebe started around 6:00 pm and still provided the lead-in for Marienhof, which started around 6:25 pm again. In the meanwhile, the Pay-TV channel Passion started airing repeats in late 2006. However, the original airings of Verbotene Liebe and Marienhof continued to lose viewers and in late 2010 cancellation rumors started to surround fan bases. Das Erste eventually canceled Marienhof after over 18 years on the air and continued Verbotene Liebe, extending their episodes to 50 minutes with commercial breaks. The glamor soap served as the lead-in for various new crime dramedy series'. With the extension, VL now aired repeats on several ARD stations.

The line-up however was changed when the network signed Thomas Gottschalk and developed a new evening talk show for him. Gottschalk Live premiered in January 2012, causing Verbotene Liebe to lose about six minutes per episode and being a rival to Unter uns again. The talk show failed miserably and was canceled in June 2012. That led to the network changing the air time of Verbotene Liebe yet again. It was announced that the soap opera would return to its old time slot at 6:00pm. Fans complained about the several air time changes.

As of the end of March 2013, all local stations of the ARD stopped airing the previous day's broadcast of the show.

Online
In 2008, Grundy UFA worked out a contract with the video-sharing website Sevenload to make the first season of Verbotene Liebe, consisting the first 250 episodes, available online. Sevenload started with the first episode on 25 August 2008. After rumors about new contract, Grundy UFA and Sevenload ended their cooperation in the following year.

Das Erste started with its own video library, Das Erste: Mediathek, in May 2008 and airs extended previews, specials and new episodes (for seven days) of Verbotene Liebe.

Grundy UFA instead went into business with the video-on-demand platform Maxdome, which is owned by ProSiebenSat.1 Media. The first 800 episodes were made available for €0,99 per episode with a valid link for 48 hours. Maxdome also owns rights to new episodes, adding them right after television broadcast starting with episode 3400. With episode 3820 the show is available in high-definition.

In 2012, MyVideo became another provider for old Verbotene Liebe episodes. Under the label Verbotene Liebe classics are currently 360 episodes available for free. MyVideo and Grundy UFA plan to extend the video library to more than the first 1000 episodes of the show. Currently there isn't an official schedule when MyVideo plans on releasing more episodes.

Ratings
In the show's best years, Verbotene Liebe had three million viewers per episode, the second-highest rated soap opera behind Gute Zeiten, schlechte Zeiten, with a 16 percent market share overall. That all began to change in 2007, when the show began losing viewers. In 2008, ratings dropped dramatically as viewers became dissatisfied with recent casting changes and lackluster storylines. On 15 December 2008, only 1.57 million viewers watched the show. Producers reacted immediately and moved the storylines in a different direction. The 3333rd episode was seen by 2.18 million viewers and featured an elegant masked ball.

One year later, Verbotene Liebe faced rumors of cancellation, when Das Erste announced intended changes to the lineup. The show was revamped, and eventually it was lead-out soap Marienhof that went off the air in mid-2011. Verbotene Liebe was extended to an hour and took over Marienhofs problematic time-slot, resulting in a dip in ratings. The ratings got much worse in 2012, which again led to rumors that the soap opera might get canceled. Overall, Verbotene Liebe halved its ratings in the last five years.

Specials
Over the years, Verbotene Liebe had several online specials, such as a weekly preview or cast interviews. However among them were also two online spin-offs:

Clarissas Tagebuch
Clarissas Tagebuch (English: Clarissa's Diary) is a 2011 five-part series that stars Isa Jank in her role as Clarissa von Anstetten. It chronicles much of Clarissa's past and shows that the character has been in a South American prison for the last ten years. The special aired before Jank would return on-screen on the main show.

Die längste Nacht von Königsbrunn
Die längste Nacht von Königsbrunn (English: The longest Night of Königsbrunn) is a 2014 fifteen-part series, set on a stormy night in the kitchen of Castle Königsbrunn. It stars Martina Servatius (Elisabeth von Lahnstein), Claus Thull-Emden (Justus Stiehl), Miriam Lahnstein (Tanja von Lahnstein), Sebastian Schlemmer (Sebastian von Lahnstein), Jana Julie Kilka (Jessica Stiehl), Jens Hartwig (Tristan von Lahnstein), Nicole Mieth (Kim Wolf) and as special guest stars Konrad Krauss (Arno Brandner) and Verena Zimmermann (Nico von Lahnstein). The special revolves around secrets of every character and concludes on 30 May 2014 with a live episode.

Revival

In early 2020, the RTL Group obtained the rights for old episodes to stream on their premium streaming service TVNOW. Viewing figures were favourable and the RTL Group decided in June 2020 to order new episodes from UFA Serial Drama for the streaming service. The intentions of RTL were made public by a Bild report on 19 June 2020. RTL later confirmed the news, planning to start filming later in 2020. The media group also announced that familiar faces, like Jo Weil, are set to return to the show.

On 1 July 2020, it was reported that TVNOW ordered a 10-episode revival season, likely to air in a weekly rhythm starting in November 2020. The revival is set to focus on a new generation with few familiar faces in the world of fashion. The working title is Verbotene Liebe - Das Erbe (en: Forbidden Love - The Heritage). The concept for the revival orientates on dramas like Dynasty and Succession. The show was later renamed Verbotene Liebe: Next Generation''''', and aired from 23 November 2020 to 25 January 2021. Jo Weil (Oliver Sabel), Gabriele Metzger (Charlie Schneider), Wolfram Grandezka (Ansgar von Lahnstein), Claudia Hiersche (Carla von Lahnstein) and Isa Jank (Clarissa von Anstetten) reprised their roles from the original series.

Awards

German Soap Awards
 2012 "Best Actor" Wolfram Grandezka (Ansgar von Lahnstein)
 2012 "Fan Award Male" Jo Weil (Oliver Sabel)
 2011 "Sexiest Woman" Jasmin Lord (Rebecca von Lahnstein)
 2011 "Fan Award Male" Jo Weil (Oliver Sabel)
 2011 "Most Beautiful Couple" Oliver Sabel and Christian Mann

Rose d'Or
 2005 "Best Soap"

See also
 List of Verbotene Liebe characters
 List of cast members of Verbotene Liebe
 Minor characters of Verbotene Liebe
 List of longest-serving soap opera actors

References

External links
 

 
1995 German television series debuts
2015 German television series endings
2000s German television series
German television soap operas
German LGBT-related television shows
Lesbian-related television shows
Television shows set in Cologne
Das Erste original programming
German-language television shows
1990s LGBT-related drama television series
2000s LGBT-related drama television series
2010s LGBT-related drama television series